The Computer museum Aachen (officially called ) existed from 1987 to 2009. It was created in cooperation with the Rogowski Institute for Electrical Engineering of the RWTH Aachen University. It was housed in the RWTH's "Campus Melaten" until the demolition of the building at Sommerfeldstrasse No. 32, Aachen.

Overview 
The museum was created in cooperation with the Rogowski Institute for Electrical Engineering at the RWTH Aachen and collected obsolete computer hardware from them as pieces for the museum.

The extensive collection, which was created in 1965 with the support of the state North Rhine-Westphalia, the German Research Foundation and the Friends of Aachen University, was one of the earliest of its kind in Germany.

The computer museum saw itself as an active museum in which visitors could work on numerous computing devices and PCs themselves and gain experience with the electronic data processing technology of the past. The computer museum was established in 1987 at the RWTH extension site in Melaten and closed at the end of 2009. From 1987 to 1993 the museum was directed by the historian .

Exhibits 
The showpiece of the exhibition was a 1958 Zuse Z22 computer system collected from the RWTH.

Some of the exhibits:
 Burroughs 1700
 DEC PDP-11/45
 DEC PDP-12
 EAI 8800 Scientific Computing System
 EAI PACE 231R
 EAI TR-48
 IBM 421
 IBM System/3 Model 10 (5410)
 IBM System/360-20
 LGP-30
 
 Telefunken RA 463/2
 
 Zuse Z22

Closure 
For this reason, the museum had to close at the end of 2009, and all the exhibits had to be moved to new locations.

As early as 2006, the museum's backhaul holdings were dissolved and initially deposited in Castrop-Rauxel. From there, financed by SAP, a large part of the collection went to the Computer History Museum (CHM) at Mountain View, California (the so called SAP collection). This included Mulby computers from Aachen production. The remaining devices were taken to a warehouse on the premises of Dortmund train station (Tillmann collection). There, the parts were badly damaged due to poor storage and were threatened of being scrapped in 2012. Private collectors managed to save and restore many artefacts.

Another part from the Aachen inventory was stored by a forwarding agency in Cologne. The costs for this were covered by the CHM until 2007/2008. After that, individual artefacts were saved by collectors, the rest were scrapped.

The latter also received the Z22. Some of the earlier exhibits were shredded.

References

Further reading 
 Entry at Universitätssammlungen in Deutschland
 Short description and photos, 
 Report on CMA-Hardware salvages 2012 at robotrontechnik.de
 [https://blog.hnf.de/computer-im-museum-vi-es-war-einmal/ Computer im Museum (VI) – es war einmal] (2022) in HNF-Blog

Computer museums
RWTH Aachen University
1965 establishments in Germany
2009 disestablishments in Germany
Defunct museums in Germany